Oza-Cesuras is a municipality of northwestern Spain in the province of A Coruña, in the autonomous community of Galicia. It is located in the comarca of Betanzos. It arose from the merger on June 6, 2013 of Cesuras and Oza dos Ríos municipalities.

References

Municipalities in the Province of A Coruña
States and territories established in 2013
2013 establishments in Spain